Ryan Patrick McCann (born 21 September 1981) is a Scottish professional footballer. He last played with Edusport Academy in the Scottish Lowland Football League.

Playing career

Celtic, St Johnstone and Hartlepool

McCann began his career with Celtic and made his full debut against Dundee Utd in the SPL. He then had a six-month loan spell at St Johnstone, before heading to Hartlepool for over a year, where he only made five appearances before breaking his ankle. McCann then headed back to St Johnstone in September 2004, where he amassed a total of 41 league appearances before missing the remaining five-months of the 2005–06 season due to injury.

Clyde and Bohemians

McCann was listed as a trialist in Clyde's third Scottish First Division match of the 2006–07 season, against Dundee, and was signed on a permanent contract a week later. In July 2007, McCann turned down a new contract at Clyde in favour of signing with Irish side Bohemians and scored his first goal for Bohs in a 1–1 draw with Drogheda United in August 2007. In November 2007, McCann finished his short spell at Bohemians a finalist in the FAI League cup and qualification for Europe.

Queen of the South and Morecambe

McCann signed for Dumfries club Queen of the South in December 2007. In March 2008, McCann scored from 84 yards for Queens in a 2–0 victory against Dundee. This secured Queens' first Scottish Cup quarter-final victory since 1950. McCann also played in the 4–3 semi final victory over Aberdeen and in the 3–2 Cup Final defeat to Rangers. In a four-month spell McCann played 20 games for Queens, scoring once and qualifying for the UEFA cup.

On 20 June 2008, the Queens website announced that McCann would be leaving the club. He signed for Football League Two side Morecambe in June 2008. McCann moved back to Dumfries in January 2009.

Airdrie United, Ayr United, Stockport County

McCann signed for Airdrie United in September 2009 on a one-year deal. He made his debut for Airdrie United against Ayr at Somerset Park.

McCann spent 2010–11 at Ayr United where he was part of a successful promotion campaign from the Scottish Second Division.

On 29 July 2011, he passed a medical and completed a move to Stockport County in English football. In January 2012, McCann was involved in a road accident and due to injury was unable to finish the season. He left Stockport county in February to recover.

UMF Einherji, Peterhead and Pollok

McCann joined Icelandic team UMF Einherji as player coach. He became head coach halfway through the season.
When the Icelandic league ended, McCann joined Scottish third Division club Peterhead for the remainder of the 2012–13 season. In March 2015, he moved on loan to Junior side Pollok. At the end of the 2014–15 season, with the Blue Toon, McCann retired from playing.

McCann subsequently joined Edusport Academy as a player-coach with their Lowland League team.

See also
2006–07 Clyde F.C. season

References

External links

1981 births
Living people
Footballers from Bellshill
Association football midfielders
Scottish footballers
Clyde F.C. players
Hartlepool United F.C. players
St Johnstone F.C. players
Celtic F.C. players
League of Ireland players
Bohemian F.C. players
Queen of the South F.C. players
Morecambe F.C. players
Airdrieonians F.C. players
Ayr United F.C. players
Stockport County F.C. players
Peterhead F.C. players
Pollok F.C. players
Scottish Premier League players
Scottish Football League players
English Football League players
National League (English football) players
Scottish expatriate footballers
Scottish Junior Football Association players
Caledonian Braves F.C. players
Ryan McCann
Caledonian Braves F.C. non-playing staff